Wocławy  is a village in the administrative district of Gmina Cedry Wielkie in Gdańsk County, Pomeranian Voivodeship, northern Poland. It has a population of 305.

For details on the region's history, see History of Pomerania.

References

Villages in Gdańsk County